Strandbad Tiefenbrunnen is a public bath in the Swiss municipality of Zürich, being part of the historical Seeuferanlage promenades that were built between 1881 and 1887.

Geography 
The bath is situated at Zürichhorn respectively in the Seefeld quarter at the Zürichsee lake shore. Public transport is provided by the VBZ transport company by the tram lines 2 and 4, the bus lines 33 and the postauto bus lines 912 and 916 to Chinagarten Zürich stop, as well as by the Zürichsee-Schifffahrtsgesellschaft towards Zürichhorn.

History and description 
As the old bathhouse had to make place for the construction of quais, the then independent municipality of Riesbach built two new bathing facilities Strandbad Tiefenbrunnen (1886) at Zürichhorn, and Seebad Utoquai (1890) at Utoquai. The lido was rebuilt in the 1950s in the living garden style. The pavilion architecture and typical contemporary garden design were built by the architects Joseph Schütz, Otto Dürr and Hans Nussbaumer. Architectural eye-catchers of the resort are the teahouse with a panoramic terrace, and the main entrance, accented by circular concrete mushrooms and trees. The waterfront is fastened with large stones that are ideal for sitting. There are nudist sun terraces on the changing buildings, separated for men and women. The bath was rebuilt in 2011/12.

Cultural heritage 
The buildings and the gardens are listed in the inventory of monuments and preservation of historic gardens. The structure is listed in the Swiss inventory of cultural property of national and regional significance as an object of regional importance.

See also 
 Zürichhorn
 Quaianlagen

References

External links 

  

1886 establishments in Switzerland
District 8 of Zürich
Public baths in Switzerland
Buildings and structures in Zürich
History of Zürich
Culture of Zürich
Buildings and structures completed in 1886
Cultural property of regional significance in Switzerland
Parks in Zürich
19th-century architecture in Switzerland